The Dick baronetcy in Prestonfield, Edinburgh was created in the Baronetage of Nova Scotia for James Dick. Initially created in 1677, it was renewed in 1707 and merged with the Cunningham of Lambrughton, Ayrshire baronetcy in 1829. The family seat was Prestonfield House, Edinburgh. Sir William Dick, 2nd Baronet and Sir Alexander Dick, 3rd Baronet were the younger sons of Sir William Cunningham, 2nd Baronet (of Lambrughton) and his wife Janet Dick, the daughter and heiress of Sir James Dick, 1st Baronet. Both brothers changed their surname to Dick on inheriting Prestonfield in turn.

The Dick-Cunyngham baronetcy of Lambrughton, Ayr was created in the Baronetage of Nova Scotia for John Cunningham in 1669. Merged with the Dick baronetcy in 1829 it became extinct in 1941. From 1683 the family seat was at Caprington, Ayrshire and from 1740 at Prestonfield.

Dick baronets of Prestonfield (1677 and 1707)

 Sir James Dick of Prestonfield, 1st Baronet (c.1644–1728) Lord Provost of Edinburgh
 Sir William Dick, 2nd Baronet (1701–1746) (born Cunningham)
 Sir Alexander Dick, 3rd Baronet (1703–1785) (born Cunningham)
 Sir William Dick, 4th Baronet (1762–1796)
 Sir Alexander Dick, 5th Baronet (1786–1808)
 Sir John Dick, 6th Baronet (1767–1812)
 Sir Robert Keith Dick, 7th Baronet (Dick-Cunyngham from 1845) (1773–1849)		

Merged in 1829 with Cunningham of Lambrughton, Ayr baronetcy as the Dick-Cunyngham baronets

Dick-Cunyngham baronets of Lambrughton, Ayr (1669)

 Sir John Cunningham, 1st Baronet (died 1684)
 Sir William Cunningham, 2nd Baronet (1664–1740)
 Sir John Cunningham, 3rd Baronet (c.1696–1777
 Sir William Cunningham, 4th Baronet (1752–1829)
 Sir Robert Keith Dick, 5th Baronet (Dick-Cunyngham from 1845) (1773–1849)	
 Sir William Hanmer Dick-Cunyngham, 6th Baronet (1808–1871)
 Sir Robert Keith Alexander Dick-Cunyngham, 7th Baronet (1836–1897)
 Sir William Stewart Dick-Cunyngham, 8th Baronet (1871–1922)					
 Sir Colin Keith Dick-Cunyngham, 9th Baronet (1908–1941) (Baronetcy extinct on his death)

Dick baronets of Braid
This baronetcy was created in 1641 for Sir William Dick of Braid (c.1590–1655) who was Provost of Edinburgh from 1638 to 1640.

On 14 March 1768, John Dick, the British consul in Leghorn, was recognised in an Edinburgh court as holder of the Dick baronetcy of Braid.

Sir William's fourth son, Alexander Dick of Heugh, was the father of the 1st Dick baronet of Prestonfield, while his fifth son, Louis, was John Dick's great-grandfather. John Dick's cause was championed by James Boswell, who had met him in Italy. After the consul died in 1805 without issue, a memorial that his claim had been invalid was issued by Charles Dick, male heir of Sir William's eldest son, another John Dick. Charles' son William was legally recognised as Sir William's male heir in 1821 and began styling himself baronet. The baronetcy was never proved in law; it was recognised by Walford's County Families, Douglas' Baronage, and Dod's and Debrett's Peerages, but not Burke's. In 1873, The Herald and Genealogist found no contemporary evidence that Sir William Dick of Braid had received a baronetcy. Chamberlayne's Present State of Great Britain, upon which John Dick's 1768 claim was founded, described the baronetcy as extinct.

References

Sources

Citations

Extinct baronetcies in the Baronetage of Nova Scotia